William Slattery, O.F.M., is an Irish-born Franciscan who served as Bishop of Kokstad from 1993 to 2010, before being appointed Archbishop of Pretoria and Bishop of South Africa, Military.

William Mathew Slattery was born in County Tipperary, Ireland in 1943.  He joined the Franciscans in 1962, and gained a BA degree from University College Galway.  He was ordained, and obtained a licence in theology in Rome in 1970, before going to South Africa in 1971. He served in various dioceses in South Africa and also in Malawi; he has also been Rector of St John Vianney Seminary. 

In 1993 he was appointed Bishop of Kokstad. In 2005 he invited the Irish charity Respond! (founded by his fellow Franciscans) to provide services in the diocese, and in 2009 supported their setting up of a housing association, Silvie. In 2010 he was appointed Archbishop of Pretoria. He retired in 2019, and was succeeded by Archbishop Dabula Mpako.

References

1943 births

Living people
Roman Catholic bishops of Kokstad
Roman Catholic archbishops of Pretoria
Alumni of the University of Galway
21st-century Roman Catholic archbishops in South Africa
Irish Friars Minor
Franciscan bishops
Irish expatriate Catholic bishops
Irish expatriate Roman Catholic archbishops